Kabenau River (also Gabina or St. Augustin River) is a river in Madang Province, Papua New Guinea. It was discovered in 1887 by geologist C. Schneider and explored in 1888 by Hugo Zöller. It flows westward and empties near Rimba to the Astrolabe Bay.

See also
Kabenau River languages

Rivers of Papua New Guinea
Madang Province